Lost in the West is a three-part comedy-western miniseries that aired on Nickelodeon from May 28–30, 2016. It was directed by Carlos González and produced by Galdo Media.

Plot 
Two stepbrothers accidentally invent a time machine and are transported from the present day to 1885, where they come into conflict with the local mayor.

Cast and characters 
 Caleb Thomas as Chip Caldwell
 Niko Guardado as Dave Flowers
 Fallon Smythe as Lisa Waters and Luna
 Morgan Higgins as Texas Jane
 James Eeles as Cody Duvalier
 Kamran Darabi-Ford as Mitch Duvalier
 Mark Schardman as Doc Duvalier
 Alex Sawyer as Jimmy the Kid
 Jeff Zach as Chief Running Water

Episodes 

The series averaged 1.14 million viewers over three consecutive days.

See also
 List of films broadcast by Nickelodeon

References

External links 
 

2010s American comedy television miniseries
2010s Nickelodeon original programming